Kokot was a settlement and castle in present-day Štúrovo, near Nové Zámky, Slovakia, destroyed in 1543 during an Ottoman invasion.

References

Former villages in Slovakia
Castles in Slovakia